Racquetball competitions at the 2023 Pan American Games in Santiago, Chile will be held at the Racket Sports Center.

Seven medal events will be contested, a singles, doubles and team events for both men and women and a mixed doubles event. A total of 48 athletes will qualify to compete at the games.

Qualification

A total of 48 racquetball athletes will qualify to compete. Each nation may enter a maximum of 4 athletes (two per gender). In each gender there will be a total of 24 athletes qualified, with the 2023 Pan American Championships being used to determine the countries qualified. Chile as host nation qualified the maximum quota automatically.

Participating nations
A total of 1 country qualified athletes.

Medalists

Men's events

Women's events

Mixed events

References

Events at the 2023 Pan American Games
2023
2023 in racquetball